Ilva Mare is a commune in Bistrița-Năsăud County, Transylvania, Romania. It is composed of two villages, Ilva Mare and Ivăneasa (Mihalyászatanya).

Natives
Alexander Vencel (born 1944), footballer

References

Communes in Bistrița-Năsăud County
Localities in Transylvania